Eggesford railway station is a rural station in Devon, England, serving Eggesford, the town of Chulmleigh and surrounding villages. Despite its name, the station is in the neighbouring civil parish of Chawleigh.

History
The station was opened by the North Devon Railway on 1 August 1854, taking its name from Eggesford House, seat of the Earl of Portsmouth who was a supporter of the railway. Although there was a passing loop it only had a single platform on the north side of the line but a second platform was eventually added. A signal box was provided in 1873 on the second platform. The platform was damaged and the signal box subsided when the River Taw flooded on 21 November 1967. The loop was taken out of use until the platform could be repaired and a new signal box opened on 28 September 1969.

A goods yard was provided at the Barnstaple end of the original platform. This was equipped with a crane and there was a small oil storage depot. Cattle markets were held in the yard from time to time.

In British Railways days the summer Saturday Atlantic Coast Express 11.00 Waterloo to Ilfracombe made its only stop between Exeter and Barnstaple at Eggesford.

The goods yard closed on 4 January 1965 and the signal box was closed on 1 December 1987.

Description 

The original building was designed in Gothic style by William Tite and built from mudstone rubble with ashlar detailing. On the Barnstaple side of the ticket office was a waiting room and parcel store. The other side was the station master's house which had an additional room added in about 1890. The main part has two storeys but the wing with the parcels store is just one storey. A passageway through the building between the ticket office and house has a gabled porch on the road side with a heraldic carving in the gable.

The station is situated in a narrow space between the main road and the river. It is on a bend with the line going eastwards to Exeter and northwards to Barnstaple. The original building is behind the Exeter-bound platform but no longer used by passengers. There are waiting shelters on both platforms. Access to the Barnstaple platform is by a short path leading from the level crossing at the east end of the station.

Signalling
The first signal box was opened on 1 October 1873. It was sited on the northbound platform but the rear was supported by two cast iron columns above a leat. When the platform subsided because of a flood in 1967 the signalman had to climb through the window. The second signal box was opened on 28 September 1969 on the same side of the line but close to the level crossing. The level crossing itself was converted to lifting barriers on 30 November 1969.

Since late 1987 the level crossing operated and tokens exchanged by the train crew. A hut at the departure end of each platform contains a No Signalman Key Token (NSKT) instrument.

Services

All services at Eggesford are operated by Great Western Railway.

Community railway
The railway between Exeter and Barnstaple is designated as a community railway and is supported by marketing provided by the Devon and Cornwall Rail Partnership. The line is promoted as the Tarka Line.

References

External links
Video footage of Eggesford station

Railway stations in Devon
Railway stations in Great Britain opened in 1854
Former London and South Western Railway stations
Railway stations served by Great Western Railway
Industrial archaeological sites in Devon
DfT Category F2 stations